The Robert W. Hamilton House is a historic house located at 203 S. 13th St. in Murphysboro, Illinois. The house was built in 1867 for Robert Wood Hamilton, a Civil War veteran who served as circuit clerk of Jackson County and postmaster of Carbondale. The house is designed in the Carpenter Gothic style and is one of two remaining Carpenter Gothic residences in Jackson County. The front porch of the house is supported by four posts, which are linked at the top by trefoil arches. A steep dormer with ornamental bargeboards tops the porch. The opposite side of the front facade features a second-floor balcony with a quatrefoil-patterned railing. The gable end atop the balcony also features ornamental bargeboards.

The house was added to the National Register of Historic Places on March 5, 1982. It is currently occupied by Fager Historic Properties, K. Fager Contracting, And Brews Brothers Taproom Offices.

References

Houses on the National Register of Historic Places in Illinois
Houses completed in 1867
Houses in Jackson County, Illinois
Carpenter Gothic architecture in Illinois
National Register of Historic Places in Jackson County, Illinois